The 1962–63 NBA season was the Zephyrs' 2nd season in the NBA, as well as their final season in the Windy City before the franchise's relocation to Baltimore for the following season.  As a result, Chicago would not have another NBA franchise until 1966, when the Bulls began play.

Roster

Regular season

Season standings

Record vs. opponents

Game log

Awards and records
Terry Dischinger, NBA Rookie of the Year Award
Terry Dischinger, NBA All-Rookie Team 1st Team

References

Washington Wizards seasons
Chicago